"The More You Give (The More You'll Have)" is a song by Canadian recording artist Michael Bublé. The song was released as a digital download on 30 November 2015 by Reprise Records.

Track listing

Chart performance

Release history

References

2015 songs
2015 singles
Michael Bublé songs
Reprise Records singles